Wasiqur Rahman (born 29 December 1994) is an Indian cricketer. He is a right-handed Wicket-keeper batter and occasionally bowls right-arm off-break. He made his debut in First-class cricket on 1 December 2015 in Ranji Trophy for Assam against Bengal. He made his Twenty20 debut on 9 January 2016 in the 2015–16 Syed Mushtaq Ali Trophy.

References

Indian cricketers
1994 births
Living people
Assam cricketers
Wicket-keepers